Eleanor V. E. Sharpston, KC (born 13 July 1955) is an English barrister who served as an Advocate General at the Court of Justice of the European Union (CJEU) from 2006 to 2020.

Nominated by the UK to serve as an Advocate General from 10 January 2006, and renewed in 2009 and again in 2015, Sharpston studied economics, languages and law at King's College, Cambridge (1973–77), followed by university teaching and research at Corpus Christi College, Oxford (1977–80). She was called to the Bar by the Middle Temple in 1980 and was a barrister in private practice from 1980 to 1987 and from 1990-2005; King's Counsel (1999); and Bencher of Middle Temple (2005). In the intervening years (1987–90) she worked as legal secretary (referendaire) in the Chambers of Advocate General, subsequently Judge, Sir Gordon Slynn later Lord Slynn of Hadley. She was also a lecturer in EC and comparative law  and Director of European Legal Studies at University College London (1990–92), and then a lecturer (1992–98), and subsequently affiliated lecturer (1998–2005), in the Faculty of Law at the University of Cambridge. She was a senior research fellow at the Centre for European Legal Studies of the University of Cambridge (1998–2005) and remains a fellow of King's College, Cambridge (since 1992).

Sharpston is also a member of the Irish Bar and an Honorary Bencher of King's Inns, Dublin. She has published books and articles on EU law. Having spent her childhood in Brazil and then her adolescence and half her practising life in continental Europe, she speaks a number of European languages. She holds dual nationality: British and Luxembourgish.

She served as joint head of Hailsham Chambers in London, with her colleague Michael Pooles QC, from 2003 to 2006. Amongst her many high-profile cases at the Bar she was perhaps best known for acting (together with her colleague Philip Moser) for the prosecution in the case of the Metric Martyrs, Thoburn v Sunderland City Council, and for the appellants in the House of Lords case R v Brown, often referred to by its police name of 'Operation Spanner'.

In 1991 she married David Lyon, a maritime historian and also a King's College alumnus whom she met through their mutual nautical interests; he died in 2000.

On 7 October 2008, she was appointed First Advocate General of the CJEU for one year. In 2010, she was awarded an honorary doctorate by the University of Glasgow. On 21 July 2011, she was awarded an honorary degree of Doctor of Laws from Nottingham Trent University. She holds further honorary doctorates from the University of Edinburgh and from Stockholm University.

In 2020, she brought judicial review proceedings against the EU over her removal from the CJEU following Brexit. On 6 October 2020 the General Court dismissed her action. On 16 June 2021 the Court of Justice of the European Union dismissed her appeal against that decision on the basis that her removal by a decision of the 27 remaining Member States was not subject to judicial review by the EU Courts.

See also

List of members of the European Court of Justice

References

Further reading

External links
 Interviewed by Alan Macfarlane 27 November 2015 (video)

1955 births
Living people
English women lawyers
Advocates General of the European Court of Justice
Fellows of King's College, Cambridge
Members of the Middle Temple
English legal scholars
English King's Counsel
20th-century King's Counsel
British officials of the European Union
Women legal scholars
20th-century women lawyers
20th-century English women
20th-century English people